Anthony Sparrow  (1612–1685) was an English Anglican priest. He was Bishop of Norwich and Bishop of Exeter.

Career
Born in 1612, Sparrow was educated and became a fellow at Queens' College, Cambridge, and was ordained a priest in February 1635. He was an adherent to the Laudianism movement. In April 1644 under the parliamentarian purge of the university, he was ejected for non-residence by Edward Montagu, 2nd Earl of Manchester.  In 1647, he was ejected from rectory of Hawkedon for using the outlawed Book of Common Prayer. Following the Restoration, he was reinstated in 1660; and held the post of Archdeacon of Sudbury from then until 1667. In 1667, he became Bishop of Exeter and in 1676 he was promoted to bishop of Norwich.  He died on 19 May 1685. In his will, he left £100 to the rebuilding of St Paul's Cathedral.

Marriage and progeny
He married and left at his death several daughters as his co-heiresses, one of whom was Joan Sparrow (d. 1703), wife of Edward Drew (d. 1714) of The Grange, Broadhembury, Devon, a Canon of Exeter Cathedral.

Bibliography
 A Sermon Concerning Confession of Sins, and the Power of Absolution (1637)
 A Rationale on the Book of Common Prayer of the Church of England (1655)
 "A Collection of Articles, Injunctions, Canons, Orders, Ordinances, and Constitutions Ecclesiastical, with other Publik Records of The Church of England, Chiefly in the Times of K. Edward. VIth. Q. Elizabeth. and K. James." ...Published to Vindicate The Church of England and to promote Uniformity and peace in the same. (1661; London, Printed by R. Norton for Timothy Garthwait at the Little North-doore of St. Paul's Church 1661)

References

External links
 Anthony Sparrow's major works at Project Canterbury

1612 births
1685 deaths
Archdeacons of Sudbury
Bishops of Exeter
Bishops of Norwich
17th-century Church of England bishops
Presidents of Queens' College, Cambridge
Vice-Chancellors of the University of Cambridge
Fellows of Queens' College, Cambridge
17th-century Anglican theologians
Anglican liturgists